Sassi Punnu Fort, also known as Miri Kalat, is a historical site and tourist spot near Turbat City in Turbat Tehsil, Kech District, Balochistan, Pakistan.

Location

History
It is believed that the fort was built between 6000 and 8000 BC. It had been ruled over and possessed by uncountable kings from ancient times including Mughal, Macedonians, Arabs, Mongols, or Ghaznivids. According to other accounts it is called Miri-Kalat and is related to prince Punnu a character in the love tale Sassui Punhun, narrated by many poets including Shah Abdul Latif Bhitai of Sindh . Punnu was the son of Jam Aali or Aari and his forefathers were rulers of this area during the 12th century. The ancient archaeological site is located near the fort in which ancient graves are sited. In the graves, the skeletons of humans are openly laid into graves. The fort is now on the verge of disappearance.

References 

Forts in Balochistan
Kech District